Magallón is a Spanish municipality, in the province of Saragossa, autonomous community of Aragon. It has an area of 78.61 km², with a population of 1221 inhabitants (INE 2008) and a density of 15.53 inhab/km².

El Camino de Santiago de Soria (in english: The Way to Santiago of Soria), also called Castilian-Aragonese, passes through the town.

Main sights
Castle
Church of Santa María de la Huerta
Convent of the Dominicans
Church of St. Lawrence, finished in 1609
Hermitage of Nuestra Señora del Rosario
Fornoles bridge over the Huecha river, of Roman origins

References

Municipalities in the Province of Zaragoza